Sipho Owen Ndlovu (born 7 October 1994) is a Zimbabwean footballer who plays as a midfielder for Chicken Inn FC and the Zimbabwe national football team. He played for Bulawayo City F.C. between 2016 and 2018.

Career

International
Ndlovu made his senior international debut on 26 March 2017 in a 0-0 friendly draw with Zambia.

Career statistics

International

References

External links

Zimbabwe Premier Soccer League players
Zimbabwean footballers
Zimbabwe international footballers
Association football midfielders
1994 births
Living people